This is a list of electoral results for the Electoral district of Dunstan in South Australian state elections.

Members for Dunstan

Election results

Elections in the 2020s

Elections in the 2010s

See also
Electoral results for the district of Norwood

References

SA elections archive: Antony Green ABC
2002 SA election: Antony Green ABC

South Australian state electoral results by district